Histone deacetylase complex subunit SAP18 is an enzyme that in humans is encoded by the SAP18 gene.

Function 

Histone acetylation plays a key role in the regulation of eukaryotic gene expression. Histone acetylation and deacetylation are catalyzed by multisubunit complexes. The protein encoded by this gene is a component of the histone deacetylase complex, which includes SIN3, SAP30, HDAC1, HDAC2, RbAp46, RbAp48, and other polypeptides. This protein directly interacts with SIN3 and enhances SIN3-mediated transcriptional repression when tethered to the promoter. Additionally, SAP18s splice variants are implicated in apoptotic cycles.

Interactions 

SAP18 has been shown to interact with 
 POLE2, and 
 RGS10.

References

Further reading

External links